Octomeria nana is an orchid species in the genus Octomeria found in Venezuela.

References

External links

nana
Plants described in 1961